Juan Simeón Esono (born 24 June 1983) is an Equatoguinean former footballer who played as a striker. He is nicknamed Bohobo.

Career
Bohobo began his career with CD Elá Nguema in 2002, before moving to Deportivo Mongomo in 2009.

International career
Bohobo earned five international caps for Equatorial Guinea between 2002 and 2009, including one FIFA World Cup qualifier.

Also, Boboho had two B matches against Liberia and Ivory Coast in 2009.

Presumed death
On 19 December 2010, Polish media announced that Bohobo had died in a car crash in Cameroon, alongside his sister Teclaireille Bille, also a footballer. However, Equatoguinean media denied this information, and released a statement from the player Pierre Désiré Colday who said that "Bohobo is not the brother of Bille and he was not on the trip".

References

1983 births
Living people
Equatoguinean footballers
Equatorial Guinea international footballers
CD Elá Nguema players
Deportivo Mongomo players
Association football forwards